In the mathematical theory of partial differential equations (PDE), the Monge cone is a geometrical object associated with a first-order equation. It is named for Gaspard Monge. In two dimensions, let

be a PDE for an unknown real-valued function u in two variables x and y. Fix a point (x0, y0, z0) and consider solution functions u which have

Each solution to (1) satisfying (2) determines the tangent plane to the graph

through the point . When F is quasilinear, the Monge cone degenerates to a single line called the Monge axis. Otherwise, the Monge cone is a proper cone since a nontrivial and non-coaxial one-parameter family of planes through a fixed point envelopes a cone. Explicitly, the original partial differential equation gives rise to a scalar-valued function on the cotangent bundle of R3, defined at a point (x,y,z) by

Vanishing of F determines a curve in the projective plane with homogeneous coordinates (a:b:c).  The dual curve is a curve in the projective tangent space at the point, and the affine cone over this curve is the Monge cone.  The cone may have multiple branches, each one an affine cone over a simple closed curve in the projective tangent space.

As the base point  varies, the cone also varies.  Thus the Monge cone is a cone field on R3.  Finding solutions of (1) can thus be interpreted as finding a surface which is everywhere tangent to the Monge cone at the point.  This is the method of characteristics.

The technique generalizes to scalar first-order partial differential equations in n spatial variables; namely,

Examples
Eikonal equation
The simplest fully nonlinear equation is the eikonal equation.  This has the form

so that the function F is given by

The dual cone consists of 1-forms a dx + b dy + c dz satisfying

Taken projectively, this defines a circle.  The dual curve is also a circle, and so the Monge cone at each point is a proper cone.

See also
 Tangent cone

References
 
 
 

Partial differential equations